Ridge Hill High School, also known as Ridge Spring Star Community Center, is a historic high-school building for African-American students located at Ridge Spring, Saluda County, South Carolina. It was built in 1934, and is a large, one-story, "H"-shaped building with a central multipurpose room and six classrooms. Ridge Hill was used as a high school until the 1956–1957 school year. It remains in use as a community center.

It was added to the National Register of Historic Places in 2010.

References

African-American history of South Carolina
School buildings on the National Register of Historic Places in South Carolina
School buildings completed in 1934
Buildings and structures in Saluda County, South Carolina
National Register of Historic Places in Saluda County, South Carolina
1934 establishments in South Carolina